Alex Sheshunoff (born c. 1973) is an American non-fiction writer. He won the Faulkner Society's Words & Wisdom Award for nonfiction writing.

Personal life
After earning a bachelor's degree in history from Yale, Sheshunoff moved to New York City where he started and ran an online magazine called E-The People. Burnt out five years later, he moved to the Pacific island of Yap.  In 2005, he moved to Iowa City where he went on to earn an MFA University of Iowa's Nonfiction Writing Program. He lives in Ojai, California and is married to Sarah Sheshunoff. They have two children, Ian Shenanigan and Andrew Commissioner.

Professional life
Sheshunoff is the author of A Beginner's Guide to Paradise which won The Faulkner Society's Words & Wisdom Nonfiction Prize, part of the William Faulkner – William Wisdom Creative Writing Competition. His other work has been published by Slate,  National Geographic Adventure, Marketplace, and various daily newspapers. He currently serves as the CEO and Co-Founder of RemoteBridge.

Bibliography
A Beginner’s Guide to Paradise, Penguin Random House, 2015 
Tales From Nowhere,

Reviews

References

External links
Nonfiction Authors Association website

American non-fiction writers
Living people
People from Ojai, California
Yale University alumni
University of Iowa alumni
Year of birth missing (living people)
Place of birth missing (living people)
Writers from New York City